is a Japanese tarento and model. She is formerly part of the Japanese idol girl group NGT48 as a first generation member.

Career 
Ogino has shared in interviews and live streams that she has auditioned for many idol groups before, including AKB48 and Idol Street but didn't pass either of them. She auditioned for AKB48's 15th Generation (2013) and as Team 8's Saitama member, but failed both of them. She was later chosen as a "Baito AKB" member, which meant temporary membership in AKB48. She later returned for the 2nd Group Draft Kaigi (2015) and was chosen by NGT48.

During the 2016 AKB48 General Election, Ogino ranked 95th. In 2017, the first-day results revealed Ogino to be in surprising first place, but after the end of the voting period, she ranked into 5th place, which still meant she was the highest-ranking member of NGT48 in the General Election. This allowed her to be part of the Senbatsu for AKB48's 49th single "#SukiNanda".

Ogino modeled for the fashion brand Heather, but following NGT48's 2019 scandal, she was dropped because of online backlash. On May 20, 2019, an unemployed Japanese man was arrested for allegedly sending death threats against Ogino to Japanese media and Niigata local government offices on May 9, 2019.

On July 27, 2021, Ogino announced her graduation from NGT48. Her graduation concert took place at Toki Messe on October 30, and she officially graduated from the group on November 8.

On May 30, 2022, Ogino terminated her contract with Horipro, her office for 4 years and 10 months. She is currently working as a freelancer.

Discography

Singles with NGT48

Singles with AKB48

Albums with AKB48 
Thumbnail
 Dakara Kimi ga Suki na no Ka
Bokutachi wa, Ano Hi no Yoake o Shitteiru

 Kutsuhimo no Musubikata
 Ren'ai Mugen Jigoku

Appearances

Stage Units 
Baito AKB Special Stage
 Glass no I LOVE YOU
NGT48 Team NIII 1st Stage "Party ga Hajimaru Yo"
 Classmate
NGT48 Team NIII 2nd Stage "Pajama Drive"
 Kagami no Naka no Jean Da Arc (Center)
 Pajama Drive
NGT48 Team NIII 3rd Stage "Hokori no Oka"
 Zankokuna Ame (Duet with Yuki Kashiwagi)

Media Appearances 
 AKBingo! (2017 - )
 HKT48 vs. NGT48 Sashikita Gassen (2016)

References

External links 

 Official website
 
 

1999 births
Living people
Japanese actresses
Japanese synth-pop singers
Japanese female models
Japanese women pop singers
NGT48 members